Alice Cooper, born in 1948 as Vincent Damon Furnier in Detroit, Michigan, is an American singer, songwriter, actor, and radio personality. At age 16 in 1964, Furnier started what would become a music career by recruiting four sports teammates to create a band for their local school talent show, calling themselves the Earwigs. The group used costumes and wigs to resemble the Beatles and won the talent show. Throughout the next four years, the band overcame lineup changes, band name changes, and even added to their stage presence—snakes, guillotines, electric chairs, fake blood, and various other horror imagery and props.

In 1968, the group chose Alice Cooper as a new band name. Furnier adopted the name for himself in 1975 to avoid legal complications of the band name ownership. The band realized it wasn't fully utilizing the stage show potential to garner publicity. Therefore, upon watching films to gain new inspiration, Cooper decided to don makeup and black eyeliner for events.

As the band fine tuned its stage presence, Alice Cooper gained attention from television and film producers. In 1970, Alice Cooper made a cameo appearance in Diary of a Mad Housewife with the original Alice Cooper band. Alice Cooper also appeared in Sextette alongside Mae West in 1978, Prince of Darkness as a street schizo in 1987, Wayne's World (1992), Dark Shadows (2012), Super Duper Alice Cooper (2014), and the Freddy Krueger franchise as Edward Underwood, Freddy's foster father. In the midst of films, Cooper made television appearances around the world. For example, he appeared on Alice Cooper a Paris, a French television special, in 1982. Cooper has appeared on several music documentaries, talk shows, game shows, sitcoms, music award ceremonies, and celebrity sports tournaments, just to name a few media categories.

Credited with helping to shape the look and sound of heavy metal, Alice Cooper is regarded as "The Godfather of Shock Rock." Over the years, Alice Cooper has been honored with numerous award nominations, many of which he has won. He was awarded a Hollywood Walk of Fame star in 2003. Alice Cooper, Michael Owen Bruce, Glen Buxton, Dennis Dunaway, and Neal Smith of the original Alice Cooper band were inducted into the Rock and Roll Hall of Fame by Rob Zombie on March 14, 2011.

Filmography 

Note: This is an incomplete filmography of appearances by Alice Cooper (as a person and as a band) in movies, television, and other visual media. Music videos, archived videos, commercials, and other "video shorts" are not included.

Film

Television

Video Games

Other Appearances

See also 
 Alice Cooper Accolades

References 

Filmography
Male actor filmographies
American filmographies